Jean-Raymond Abrial (born 1938) is a French computer scientist and inventor of the Z and B formal methods.

Abrial's 1974 paper Data Semantics laid the foundation for a formal approach to Data Models; although not adopted directly by practitioners, it directly influenced all subsequent models from the Entity-Relationship Model through to RDF.

J.-R. Abrial is the father of the Z notation (typically used for formal specification of software), during his time at the Programming Research Group within the Oxford University Computing Laboratory (now Oxford University Department of Computer Science), and later the B-Method (normally used for software development), two formal methods for software engineering. He is the author of The B-Book: Assigning Programs to Meanings. For much of his career he has been an independent consultant. He was an invited professor at ETH Zurich from 2004 to 2009.

References

External links 
 
  by Jonathan Bowen
 Managing the Construction of Large Computerized Systems — article
 Have we learned from the Wasa disaster (video) — talk by Jean-Raymond Abrial

1938 births
Living people
French computer scientists
Members of the Department of Computer Science, University of Oxford
Formal methods people
Z notation
Computer science writers
Software engineers
Software engineering researchers
Academic staff of ETH Zurich